Sedriano is a comune (municipality) in the Metropolitan City of Milan in the Italian region Lombardy, located about  west of Milan.

Sedriano borders the following municipalities: Vanzago, Pregnana Milanese, Arluno, Bareggio, Vittuone, Cisliano.

References

External links
 Official website

Cities and towns in Lombardy